Fear Zero is Fear Zero's first studio release. It was released in 2004 under the label Satch Records.

Track listing 

 "Satellite"
 "Drown Myself"
 "Star Trippin' "
 "Sunday Morning"
 "Learn To Love"
 "Won't Hurt"
 "I'm Alright"
 "Seven Sunny Days"
 "Never Felt Better"
 "Nowhere"

References 

Fear Zero
2003 albums